Highway 42 (AR 42, Ark. 42, and Hwy. 42) is an east–west state highway of  in Northeast Arkansas. The highways begins in the corn and cotton fields of the Mississippi Alluvial Plain at Highway 37, crosses the Crowley's Ridge and ends in the St. Francis Lowlands. The highway is a rural, two-lane road with relatively low traffic serving a sparsely populated agricultural area of Arkansas. Highway 42 is one of the original state highways created during the 1926 Arkansas state highway numbering, and has remained largely unchanged since bridge construction and an eastward extension in 1938. It is maintained by the Arkansas Department of Transportation (ARDOT).

Route description
Highway 42 runs begins in southeastern Jackson County within a historic and cultural region known as the Arkansas Delta. The western terminus is at Highway 37 south of Beedeville and just east of the Cache River National Wildlife Refuge; Highway 42 runs due east as a section line road to a junction with Highway 145 before entering Cross County.

Entering Cross County, Highway 42 bridges Bayou DeView before entering the small town of Hickory Ridge. Shortly after entering town, the highway crosses the Union Pacific Railway tracks and intersects US Highway 49 (US 49, Flora Street). Highway 42 continues east, serving as the northern terminus of Highway 259 at the eastern city limits before continuing east as a section line road, curving to maintain alignment near Brushy Creek Wildlife Management Area and serving as the northern terminus of Highway 193 on its way through sparsely populated agricultural land. Shortly after crossing the L'Anguille River, Highway 42 enters the small town of Cherry Valley. Highway 42 intersects Highway 1 at a skew intersection, beginning a concurrency east with Highway 1 Business (AR 1B). As the routes approach downtown Cherry Valley, Highway 1B turns northward, with Highway 42 continuing east across the Union Pacific Railway tracks and across the loess hills of Crowley's Ridge.

Along the eastern edge of Crowley's Ridge, Highway 42 intersects Highway 163 (Crowley's Ridge Parkway) in the unincorporated community of Birdeye before entering the St. Francis Lowlands. Highway 42 crosses two man-made drainage ditches and their levees (the St. Francis Bay Ditch and Cross County Ditch) before intersecting Highway 75 and crossing the St. Francis River at Coldwater. The route continues eastward, passing through Twist and entering Crittenden County.

Highway 42 passes through agricultural lands to intersect Highway 149 at Three Forks. Highway 42 continues east as a section line road, intersecting Highway 118 near Heafer and crossing Big Creek twice before an intersection with Interstate 55 (I-55) in Turrell. It continues east in Turrell, intersecting Highway 77 and the BNSF Railway tracks before turning north toward downtown Turrell. Becoming Hammond Street, Highway 42 briefly straddles the border between Turrell and the Wapanocca National Wildlife Refuge, intersecting the road leading to the NWR Headquarters before returning within the city limits. Highway 42 follows the BNSF tracks north to Barton Street, where it terminates.

The ArDOT maintains Highway 42 like all other parts of the state highway system. As a part of these responsibilities, the department tracks the volume of traffic using its roads in surveys using a metric called average annual daily traffic (AADT). The ArDOT estimates the traffic level for a segment of roadway for any average day of the year in these surveys. The peak traffic volume is within Cherry Valley, estimated at 1,500 vehicles per day (VPD), followed by 920 VPD along the segment in Hickory Ridge. The remainder of the segments have traffic volumes below 800 VPD. For reference, the American Association of State Highway and Transportation Officials (AASHTO) classifies roads with fewer than 400 vehicles per day as a very low volume local road.

No segment of Highway 42 has been listed as part of the National Highway System, a network of roads important to the nation's economy, defense, and mobility.

History
During the 1926 Arkansas state highway numbering, State Road 42 was designated between the current western terminus at Highway 37 to Highway 16 (present-day US 64) near Parkin. By 1938, bridge construction had been completed, allowing an extension through Coldwater to Three Forks. Highway 42 replaced Highway 75 between Three Forks and US 61 in Turrell, with the former segment from Coldwater to US 64 in Parkin becoming Highway 75. The bridge over the St. Francis River was lost in 1950, a replacement was opened to the south at Coldwater in 1968.

The Arkansas General Assembly deleted the extension between Three Forks and Turrell in favor of extending Highway 149 by Act 383 of 1951. At the request of the Crittenden County Judge, the State Highway Commission studied the roadway and reinstated the extension during a meeting August 25-28, 1953. After hearing a presentation during their meeting on August 26, 1954, the Highway Commission offered a swap to the Crittenden County Judge to remove the recently re-designated segment in favor of paving a few other roads in the vicinity and accepting them into the highway system. The offer was revised on March 9, 1955 to only extend Highway 42 from US 61/US 63 (present-day I-55) to downtown Turrell.

Major intersections
Mile markers reset at some concurrencies.

See also

Notes

References

External links

 (Historic Bridge Plans) Route 42, Section 3 St. Francis Bay Ditch
 (Historic Bridge Plans) Route 42, Section 3 St. Francis River

042
Transportation in Jackson County, Arkansas
Transportation in Cross County, Arkansas
Transportation in Crittenden County, Arkansas